The Youth Initiative High School is a private high school located in Viroqua, Wisconsin. The school was started in 1996 as a collaboration between a group of students, teachers and parents. It is democratically run, with students receiving one third of the decision-making power along with parents and school faculty.

It is founded on a Waldorf curriculum and has been recognized by the Association of Waldorf Schools of North America as a developing member.

In 2015, Youth Initiative High School was chosen by the international organization Ashoka as a "Changemaker School", making it the first high school in the United States to receive the award.

References

Schools in Vernon County, Wisconsin
Private high schools in Wisconsin
Waldorf schools